The Slavyansk constituency (No.48) is a Russian legislative constituency in Krasnodar Krai. The constituency is based in western Krasnodar Krai, covering the Taman Peninsula, resort-city Anapa and extending inland as far as Krymsk and Slavyansk-na-Kubani. Previously the constituency also covered Novorossiysk but the city was redistricted to Tuapse constituency in 2003.

Members elected

Election results

1993

|-
! colspan=2 style="background-color:#E9E9E9;text-align:left;vertical-align:top;" |Candidate
! style="background-color:#E9E9E9;text-align:left;vertical-align:top;" |Party
! style="background-color:#E9E9E9;text-align:right;" |Votes
! style="background-color:#E9E9E9;text-align:right;" |%
|-
|style="background-color:"|
|align=left|Nina Zatsepina
|align=left|Independent
|
|17.20%
|-
| colspan="5" style="background-color:#E9E9E9;"|
|- style="font-weight:bold"
| colspan="3" style="text-align:left;" | Total
| 
| 100%
|-
| colspan="5" style="background-color:#E9E9E9;"|
|- style="font-weight:bold"
| colspan="4" |Source:
|
|}

1995

|-
! colspan=2 style="background-color:#E9E9E9;text-align:left;vertical-align:top;" |Candidate
! style="background-color:#E9E9E9;text-align:left;vertical-align:top;" |Party
! style="background-color:#E9E9E9;text-align:right;" |Votes
! style="background-color:#E9E9E9;text-align:right;" |%
|-
|style="background-color:"|
|align=left|Nina Zatsepina (incumbent)
|align=left|Power to the People!
|
|19.56%
|-
|style="background-color:"|
|align=left|Viktor Krokhmal
|align=left|Independent
|
|15.64%
|-
|style="background-color:"|
|align=left|Vitaly Taranets
|align=left|Independent
|
|12.62%
|-
|style="background-color:"|
|align=left|Vladimir Popov
|align=left|Liberal Democratic Party
|
|9.42%
|-
|style="background-color:#1A1A1A"|
|align=left|Zoya Lagutina
|align=left|Stanislav Govorukhin Bloc
|
|7.18%
|-
|style="background-color:#F7C451"|
|align=left|Mikhail Kovalyuk
|align=left|Common Cause
|
|4.93%
|-
|style="background-color:"|
|align=left|Vladimir Alekseyenko
|align=left|Yabloko
|
|4.42%
|-
|style="background-color:"|
|align=left|Ivan Garmash
|align=left|Independent
|
|4.13%
|-
|style="background-color:"|
|align=left|Ivan Glumov
|align=left|Our Home – Russia
|
|3.68%
|-
|style="background-color:"|
|align=left|Valentin Kuzmenko
|align=left|Agrarian Party
|
|3.42%
|-
|style="background-color:"|
|align=left|Olga Zhukova
|align=left|Kedr
|
|2.35%
|-
|style="background-color:"|
|align=left|Aleksandr Makarenko
|align=left|Independent
|
|1.41%
|-
|style="background-color:"|
|align=left|Anatoly Tiron
|align=left|Political Movement of Transport Workers
|
|0.91%
|-
|style="background-color:"|
|align=left|Eduard Manvilov
|align=left|Independent
|
|0.89%
|-
|style="background-color:#CE1100"|
|align=left|Vasily Petridis
|align=left|My Fatherland
|
|0.86%
|-
|style="background-color:"|
|align=left|Mikhail Pavlov
|align=left|Independent
|
|0.47%
|-
|style="background-color:#000000"|
|colspan=2 |against all
|
|6.22%
|-
| colspan="5" style="background-color:#E9E9E9;"|
|- style="font-weight:bold"
| colspan="3" style="text-align:left;" | Total
| 
| 100%
|-
| colspan="5" style="background-color:#E9E9E9;"|
|- style="font-weight:bold"
| colspan="4" |Source:
|
|}

1999

|-
! colspan=2 style="background-color:#E9E9E9;text-align:left;vertical-align:top;" |Candidate
! style="background-color:#E9E9E9;text-align:left;vertical-align:top;" |Party
! style="background-color:#E9E9E9;text-align:right;" |Votes
! style="background-color:#E9E9E9;text-align:right;" |%
|-
|style="background-color:"|
|align=left|Sergey Shishkarev
|align=left|Independent
|
|36.77%
|-
|style="background-color:"|
|align=left|Georgy Titarenko
|align=left|Independent
|
|10.18%
|-
|style="background-color:"|
|align=left|Vasily Teterin
|align=left|Unity
|
|10.04%
|-
|style="background-color:"|
|align=left|Lidia Kichanova
|align=left|Yabloko
|
|8.76%
|-
|style="background-color:#020266"|
|align=left|Vasily Zakharov
|align=left|Russian Socialist Party
|
|4.86%
|-
|style="background-color:"|
|align=left|Vladimir Savchenko
|align=left|Liberal Democratic Party
|
|3.62%
|-
|style="background-color:"|
|align=left|Georgy Parublev
|align=left|Independent
|
|3.41%
|-
|style="background-color:#E2CA66"|
|align=left|Viktor Shumilov
|align=left|For Civil Dignity
|
|0.82%
|-
|style="background-color:#000000"|
|colspan=2 |against all
|
|17.70%
|-
| colspan="5" style="background-color:#E9E9E9;"|
|- style="font-weight:bold"
| colspan="3" style="text-align:left;" | Total
| 
| 100%
|-
| colspan="5" style="background-color:#E9E9E9;"|
|- style="font-weight:bold"
| colspan="4" |Source:
|
|}

2003

|-
! colspan=2 style="background-color:#E9E9E9;text-align:left;vertical-align:top;" |Candidate
! style="background-color:#E9E9E9;text-align:left;vertical-align:top;" |Party
! style="background-color:#E9E9E9;text-align:right;" |Votes
! style="background-color:#E9E9E9;text-align:right;" |%
|-
|style="background-color:"|
|align=left|Ivan Kharchenko
|align=left|Rodina
|
|40.07%
|-
|style="background-color:"|
|align=left|Anatoly Shaplov
|align=left|Independent
|
|13.61%
|-
|style="background-color: " |
|align=left|Vladimir Merkachev
|align=left|Communist Party
|
|13.05%
|-
|style="background-color:"|
|align=left|Margarita Zemtsova
|align=left|Liberal Democratic Party
|
|6.01%
|-
|style="background-color:"|
|align=left|Andrey Rakulenko
|align=left|Yabloko
|
|4.58%
|-
|style="background-color:#164C8C"|
|align=left|Galina Denisenko
|align=left|United Russian Party Rus'
|
|4.50%
|-
|style="background-color:"|
|align=left|Dmitry Amichba
|align=left|Independent
|
|1.00%
|-
|style="background-color:#000000"|
|colspan=2 |against all
|
|15.28%
|-
| colspan="5" style="background-color:#E9E9E9;"|
|- style="font-weight:bold"
| colspan="3" style="text-align:left;" | Total
| 
| 100%
|-
| colspan="5" style="background-color:#E9E9E9;"|
|- style="font-weight:bold"
| colspan="4" |Source:
|
|}

2016

|-
! colspan=2 style="background-color:#E9E9E9;text-align:left;vertical-align:top;" |Candidate
! style="background-color:#E9E9E9;text-align:left;vertical-align:top;" |Party
! style="background-color:#E9E9E9;text-align:right;" |Votes
! style="background-color:#E9E9E9;text-align:right;" |%
|-
|style="background-color: " |
|align=left|Ivan Demchenko
|align=left|United Russia
|
|63.60%
|-
|style="background-color:"|
|align=left|Anna Bobreshova
|align=left|Liberal Democratic Party
|
|8.66%
|-
|style="background-color:"|
|align=left|Dmitry Kolomiyets
|align=left|Communist Party
|
|8.25%
|-
|style="background-color:"|
|align=left|Vitaly Prytkov
|align=left|A Just Russia
|
|7.88%
|-
|style="background:"| 
|align=left|Sergey Ketov
|align=left|Communists of Russia
|
|2.86%
|-
|style="background:"| 
|align=left|Aleksey Yegorov
|align=left|Yabloko
|
|2.07%
|-
|style="background-color:"|
|align=left|Nikolay Manyak
|align=left|Rodina
|
|1.19%
|-
|style="background:"| 
|align=left|Yury Izmaylov
|align=left|Patriots of Russia
|
|1.14%
|-
|style="background-color: "|
|align=left|Oleg Lugin
|align=left|Party of Growth
|
|1.10%
|-
|style="background-color:"|
|align=left|Mikhail Kachula
|align=left|The Greens
|
|0.75%
|-
| colspan="5" style="background-color:#E9E9E9;"|
|- style="font-weight:bold"
| colspan="3" style="text-align:left;" | Total
| 
| 100%
|-
| colspan="5" style="background-color:#E9E9E9;"|
|- style="font-weight:bold"
| colspan="4" |Source:
|
|}

2021

|-
! colspan=2 style="background-color:#E9E9E9;text-align:left;vertical-align:top;" |Candidate
! style="background-color:#E9E9E9;text-align:left;vertical-align:top;" |Party
! style="background-color:#E9E9E9;text-align:right;" |Votes
! style="background-color:#E9E9E9;text-align:right;" |%
|-
|style="background-color: " |
|align=left|Ivan Demchenko (incumbent)
|align=left|United Russia
|
|72.29%
|-
|style="background-color:"|
|align=left|Dmitry Kolomiyets
|align=left|Communist Party
|
|11.84%
|-
|style="background-color:"|
|align=left|Irina Antishko
|align=left|A Just Russia — For Truth
|
|3.38%
|-
|style="background-color: "|
|align=left|Nikolay Bukin
|align=left|Party of Pensioners
|
|2.87%
|-
|style="background-color: " |
|align=left|Nikita Izyumov
|align=left|New People
|
|2.34%
|-
|style="background-color:"|
|align=left|Valeria Yeryutina
|align=left|Liberal Democratic Party
|
|2.23%
|-
|style="background-color:"|
|align=left|Ruslan Ababko
|align=left|Civic Platform
|
|1.16%
|-
|style="background-color:"|
|align=left|Vasily Baykovsky
|align=left|The Greens
|
|0.93%
|-
|style="background-color:"|
|align=left|Aleksandr Kuzmenko
|align=left|Yabloko
|
|0.78%
|-
|style="background-color: "|
|align=left|Valery Yatsenko
|align=left|Party of Growth
|
|0.72%
|-
| colspan="5" style="background-color:#E9E9E9;"|
|- style="font-weight:bold"
| colspan="3" style="text-align:left;" | Total
| 
| 100%
|-
| colspan="5" style="background-color:#E9E9E9;"|
|- style="font-weight:bold"
| colspan="4" |Source:
|
|}

Notes

References

Russian legislative constituencies
Politics of Krasnodar Krai